Cerveza preparada ('prepared beer') is a Mexican drink of beer mixed with sauces, lemon, salt, hot sauce, or salsa.

The drink dates back to the 1940s, when it became popular in Mexico.

The basic recipe is Maggi sauce, Worcestershire sauce, salt, hot sauce and lemon mixed with beer in an ice-cold, salt-rimmed pint glass. The beer is added by pouring it from high above the glass so that the contents will mix properly.

Variations

Chamochela
A chamochela is a beer-based drink prepared with lemon, salt, chili powder and chamoy. It is served with ice and garnished with tamarind candy. It was popularized in the 2000s in Mexico.

Michalada con clamato
A Michelada con clamato is a cerveza preparada that is popular in Mexican restaurants both as a drink and as an appetizer if it is served with a garnish. It is made with tomato juice, Clamato, or V8 Vegetable Juice  mixed with beer and seasoned with hot sauce (e.g., Tabasco, Tapatio, or Búfalo). It is served on the rocks in an ice-cold, salt-rimmed mug and garnished with crudités (carrot and celery sticks) or shrimp.

Michelada

A michelada is a Mexican drink made from beer mixed with spice, sauce and lime.

Negro y Marron
The Negro y Marron is a mix of beer, ice, Clamato, lemon or lime juice and tequila. It is seasoned with hot sauce and served in a chilled beer mug rimmed with salt.

Appetizers
Cocktails with beer
Mexican alcoholic drinks
Beer in Mexico
Cocktails